Bingley Five-Rise Locks is a staircase lock on the Leeds and Liverpool Canal at Bingley.  As the name implies, a boat passing through the lock is lifted or lowered in five stages.

Description

In effect the five-rise consists of five locks connected  without intermediate "ponds": the lower gate of each chamber forms the upper gate of the chamber below. There are therefore five chambers, and six gates. Water pressure on the uphill side of the gate keeps it tightly closed until the water levels on either side are equal, when the gate can be opened and the boat moved to the next chamber (see canal locks for more information on how a lock is constructed and operated).

The intermediate and bottom gates are the tallest in the country. Because of the complications of working a staircase lock  and because so many boaters (both first-time hirers and  new owners) are inexperienced, a full-time lock keeper is employed and the locks are padlocked out of hours. Barry Whitelock, the lock keeper, worked here for almost 30 years, becoming closely associated with the flight. Barry was awarded an MBE in the 2007 New Year Honours List for "Services to Inland Waterways in the North" and retired in 2017 as the country's longest-serving lock keeper. The locks also have an overflow waterfall at the side, which water runs down when the lock is not open. When a descending boat enters each lock chamber the water level rises slightly and the excess overflows via a channel at the side of each lock which runs into the main overflow.

The structure is Grade I listed.

History

The five-rise opened on 21 March 1774 and was a major feat of engineering at the time. When the locks and therefore the canal from Gargrave to Thackley was opened in 1774, a crowd of 30,000 people turned out to celebrate. The first boat to use the locks took just 28 minutes. The first trip was described in the Leeds Intelligencer. The smaller Bingley Three Rise Locks opened at the same time just a few hundred yards downstream.

Tourism

The staircase is a tourist attraction in the area. Boats that pass through often attract a crowd of gongoozlers.

Maintenance

The staircase underwent extensive restoration in 2004 and again in 2006, when the lock gates and paddles were replaced. As is expected with such a feat of engineering it requires a lot of maintenance and is often on British Waterways' list of winter stoppages for maintenance.

In January 2012 the locks were drained to allow the installation of new lock gates.  The new gates are made of English green oak and, taken together with the balance beam, weigh more than 5 tonnes.

See also

 Grade I listed buildings in West Yorkshire
 Listed buildings in Bingley
 Foxton Locks near Market Harborough, Leicestershire
 Watford Locks in Northamptonshire
 Caen Hill Locks near Devizes, Wiltshire
 Fourteen Locks near Newport, South Wales
 Tardebigge Locks near Bromsgrove, Worcestershire

References

External links

 Skipton Web: Five Rise Locks
 Pennine Waterways
 BBC Online - Rare glimpse of drained 18th Century Bingley Five Rise Locks during gate maintenance January 2012

Grade I listed buildings in West Yorkshire
Grade I listed canals
Staircase locks of England
Canals in Bradford
Tourist attractions in the City of Bradford
Locks of Yorkshire
Buildings and structures in Bingley